The 2013–14 Boston Celtics season was the franchise's 68th season in the National Basketball Association (NBA). The Celtics made several major changes to the team, including hiring Brad Stevens as the new head coach and sending Kevin Garnett, Paul Pierce, and Jason Terry to the Brooklyn Nets. The Celtics finished 25–57 and failed to qualify for the playoffs for the first time since 2007. As of 2022, this is the last time that the Celtics failed to qualify for the playoffs.

Key dates
June 3: Head Coach Doc Rivers allowed out of his contract to coach Los Angeles Clippers and the Celtics were given a 2015 unprotected first round pick as compensation.
June 27: The 2013 NBA draft took place at the Barclays Center in Brooklyn, New York.
July 1: 2013 NBA Free Agency begins.
July 3: Brad Stevens hired as new head coach.
July 12: Paul Pierce, Kevin Garnett, and Jason Terry traded to the Brooklyn Nets.
January 17: Rajon Rondo returned from ACL injury and was named the 15th Team Captain in team history.

Draft picks

Roster

Pre-season

|- style="background:#edbebf;"
| 1 
| October 7
| Toronto
| 
| Gerald Wallace (16)
| Jared Sullinger (6)
| Kelly Olynyk (5)
| TD Garden16,424
| 0–1
|- style="background:#edbebf;"
| 2 
| October 9
| New York
| 
| Phil Pressey (13)
| Sullinger & Faverani (6)
| Phil Pressey (7)
| Dunkin' Donuts Center10,404
| 0–2
|- style="background:#edbebf;"
| 3 
| October 11
| @ Philadelphia
| 
| Jared Sullinger (19)
| Brandon Bass (10)
| Phil Pressey (5)
| Bob Carpenter Center4,646
| 0–3
|- style="background:#bfb;"
| 4 
| October 12
| New York
| 
| Kelly Olynyk (15)
| Bass & Crawford (7)
| Green, Crawford, Olynyk, & Lee (3)
| Verizon Wireless Arena9,391
| 1–3
|- style="background:#edbebf;"
| 5 
| October 15
| @ Brooklyn
| 
| Courtney Lee (14)
| Avery Bradley (9)
| Jordan Crawford (6)
| Barclays Center15,554
| 1–4
|- style="background:#edbebf;"
| 6 
| October 16
| @ Toronto
| 
| MarShon Brooks (17)
| Kelly Olynyk (9)
| Lee & Pressey (5)
| Air Canada Centre13,331
| 1–5
|- style="background:#edbebf;"
| 7 
| October 20
| @ Minnesota
| 
| Gerald Wallace (16)
| Brandon Bass (8)
| Wallace & Bradley (3)
| Bell Centre20,152
| 1–6
|- style="background:#bfb;"
| 8 
| October 23
| Brooklyn
| 
| Bradley & Bass (16)
| Brandon Bass (9)
| Gerald Wallace (5)
| TD Garden15,865
| 2–6

Regular season

Season standings

Game log

|- style="background:#fcc;"
| 1 
| October 30
| @ Toronto
| 
| Jeff Green (25)
| Kris Humphries (9)
| Jordan Crawford (5)
| Air Canada Centre20,155
| 0–1

|- style="background:#fcc;"
| 2 
| November 1
| Milwaukee
| 
| Brandon Bass (17)
| Vítor Faverani (18)
| Gerald Wallace (4)
| TD Garden18,624
| 0–2
|- style="background:#fcc;"
| 3 
| November 3
| @ Detroit
| 
| Kelly Olynyk (15)
| Bass, Bradley, Olynyk (8)
| Bass & Bradley (3)
| Palace of Auburn Hills14,978
| 0–3
|- style="background:#fcc;"
| 4 
| November 4
| @ Memphis
| 
| Jeff Green (22)
| Vítor Faverani (6)
| Jordan Crawford (4)
| FedExForum15,872
| 0–4
|- style="background:#cfc;"
| 5 
| November 6
| Utah
| 
| Brandon Bass (20)
| Gerald Wallace (9)
| Green & Crawford (4)
| TD Garden17,130
| 1–4
|- style="background:#cfc;"
| 6 
| November 8
| @ Orlando
| 
| Brandon Bass (16)
| Avery Bradley (8)
| Jordan Crawford (5)
| Amway Center17,555
| 2–4
|- style="background:#cfc;"
| 7 
| November 9
| @ Miami
| 
| Jeff Green (24)
| Olynyk & Sullinger (8)
| Gerald Wallace (7)
| American Airlines Arena19,710
| 3–4
|- style="background:#cfc;"
| 8 
| November 11
| Orlando
| 
| Avery Bradley (24)
| Kelly Olynyk (7)
| Jordan Crawford (10)
| TD Garden18,624
| 4–4
|- style="background:#fcc;"
| 9 
| November 13
| Charlotte
| 
| Jeff Green (19)
| Kelly Olynyk (11)
| Jordan Crawford (6)
| TD Garden17,032
| 4–5
|- style="background:#fcc;"
| 10 
| November 15
| Portland
| 
| Jared Sullinger (26)
| Jared Sullinger (8)
| Jordan Crawford (5)
| TD Garden18,624
| 4–6
|- style="background:#fcc;"
| 11 
| November 16
| @ Minnesota
| 
| Avery Bradley (27)
| Vítor Faverani (14)
| Jordan Crawford (5)
| Target Center15,111
| 4–7
|- style="background:#fcc;"
| 12 
| November 19
| @ Houston
| 
| Courtney Lee (17)
| Jared Sullinger (9)
| Phil Pressey (5)
| Toyota Center18,232
| 4–8
|- style="background:#fcc;"
| 13 
| November 20
| @ San Antonio
| 
| Jeff Green (19)
| Jared Sullinger (17)
| Jordan Crawford (4)
| AT&T Center18,581
| 4–9
|- style="background:#fcc;"
| 14 
| November 22
| Indiana
| 
| Jordan Crawford (24)
| Avery Bradley (7)
| Jordan Crawford (4)
| TD Garden18,624
| 4–10
|- style="background:#cfc;"
| 15 
| November 23
| @ Atlanta
| 
| Brandon Bass (17)
| Jared Sullinger (9)
| Jordan Crawford (10)
| Philips Arena15,189
| 5–10
|- style="background:#cfc;"
| 16 
| November 25
| @ Charlotte
| 
| Jordan Crawford (21)
| Jared Sullinger (8)
| Phil Pressey (8)
| Time Warner Cable Arena13,558
| 6–10
|- style="background:#fcc;"
| 17 
| November 27
| Memphis
| 
| Jeff Green (26)
| Brandon Bass (13)
| Jordan Crawford (7)
| TD Garden17,319
| 6–11
|- style="background:#cfc;"
| 18 
| November 29
| Cleveland
| 
| Jeff Green (31)
| Jordan Crawford (11)
| Jordan Crawford (10)
| TD Garden17,685
| 7–11
|- style="background:#fcc;"
| 19 
| November 30
| @ Milwaukee
| 
| Jared Sullinger (21)
| Jared Sullinger (14)
| Jeff Green (6)
| BMO Harris Bradley Center15,471
| 7–12

|- style="background:#cfc;"
| 20 
| December 3
| Milwaukee
|  
| Jordan Crawford (25)
| Brandon Bass (9)
| Jordan Crawford (5)
| TD Garden16,649
| 8–12
|- style="background:#cfc;"
| 21 
| December 6
| Denver
| 
| Jordan Crawford (22)
| Brandon Bass (8)
| Jordan Crawford (8)
| TD Garden17,263
| 9–12
|- style="background:#cfc;"
| 22 
| December 8
| @ New York
| 
| Jordan Crawford (23)
| Avery Bradley (10)
| Jordan Crawford (7)
| Madison Square Garden19,812
| 10–12
|- style="background:#fcc;"
| 23 
| December 10
| @ Brooklyn
| 
| Avery Bradley (22)
| Brandon Bass (11)
| Jordan Crawford (4)
| Barclays Center15,738
| 10–13
|- style="background:#fcc;"
| 24 
| December 11
| L.A. Clippers
| 
| Jeff Green (28)
| Brandon Bass (12) 
| Jordan Crawford (9)
| TD Garden17,587
| 10–14
|- style="background:#cfc;"
| 25 
| December 13
| New York
| 
| Jared Sullinger (19)
| Brandon Bass (8)
| Jordan Crawford (6)
| TD Garden17,479
| 11–14
|- style="background:#cfc;"
| 26 
| December 16
| Minnesota
| 
| Jared Sullinger (24)
| Jared Sullinger (11)
| Jared Sullinger (5)
| TD Garden17,071
| 12–14
|- style="background:#fcc;"
| 27 
| December 18
| Detroit
| 
| Jared Sullinger (19)
| Jared Sullinger (8)
| Jordan Crawford (6)
| TD Garden17,101
| 12–15
|- style="background:#fcc;"
| 28 
| December 21
| Washington
| 
| Avery Bradley (26)
| Sullinger, Bass  (11)
| Jordan Crawford (8)
| TD Garden18,169 
| 12–16
|- style="background:#fcc;"
| 29 
| December 22
| @ Indiana
| 
| Avery Bradley (13)
| Jeff Green (6)
| Kelly Olynyk (4)
| Bankers Life Fieldhouse18,165
| 12–17
|- style="background:#cfc;"
| 30 
| December 28
| Cleveland
| 
| Crawford, Green (19)
| Bradley, Green (8)
| Crawford (5)
| TD Garden18,624
| 13–17
|- style="background:#fcc;"
| 31 
| December 31
| Atlanta
| 
| Kelly Olynyk (21)
| Sullinger, Humphries (10)
| Jordan Crawford (5)
| TD Garden18,624
| 13–18

|- style="background:#fcc;"
| 32 
| January 2
| @ Chicago
| 
| Jordan Crawford (22)
| Sullinger, Humphries (11)
| Jordan Crawford (7)
| United Center21,721
| 13–19
|- style="background:#fcc;"
| 33 
| January 3
| New Orleans
| 
| Avery Bradley (22)
| Kris Humphries (12)
| Jordan Crawford (11)
| TD Garden18,624
| 13–20
|- style="background:#fcc;"
| 34 
| January 5
| @ Oklahoma City
| 
| Green, Bradley (19)
| Sullinger, Olynyk (8)
| Jordan Crawford (7)
| Chesapeake Energy Arena18,203
| 13–21
|- style="background:#fCC;"
| 35 
| January 7
| @ Denver
| 
| Jeff Green (17)
| Bass, Sullinger (7)
| Jordan Crawford (5)
| Pepsi Center16,224
| 13–22
|- style="background:#fcc;"
| 36 
| January 8
| @ L.A. Clippers
| 
| Crawford, Bradley (24)
| Green (11)
| Jordan Crawford (8)
| Staples Center19,214
| 13–23
|- style="background:#fcc;"
| 37 
| January 10
| @ Golden State
| 
| Jeff Green (24)
| Kris Humphries (14)
| Jordan Crawford (7)
| Oracle Arena19,596
| 13–24
|- style="background:#fcc;"
| 38 
| January 11
| @ Portland
| 
| Avery Bradley (25)
| Jared Sullinger (10)
| Crawford, Bayless (6)
| Moda Center20,011
| 13–25
|- style="background:#fcc;"
| 39 
| January 13
| Houston
| 
| Avery Bradley (24)
| Jared Sullinger (10)
| Jordan Crawford (5)
| TD Garden17,750
| 13–26
|- style="background:#cfc;"
| 40 
| January 15
| Toronto
| 
| Jared Sullinger (25)
| Jared Sullinger (20)
| Phil Pressey (10)
| TD Garden17,569
| 14–26
|- style="background:#fcc;"
| 41 
| January 17
| L.A. Lakers
| 
| Kelly Olynyk (25)
| Jeff Green (9)
| Phil Pressey (9)
| TD Garden18,624
| 14–27
|- style="background:#fcc;"
| 42 
| January 19
| @ Orlando
| 
| Jeff Green (22)
| Kris Humphries (12)
| Phil Pressey (5)
| Amway Center17,548
| 14–28
|- style="background:#fcc;"
| 43 
| January 21
| @ Miami
| 
| Brandon Bass (15)
| Kris Humphries (13)
| Rajon Rondo (5)
| American Airlines Arena19,619
| 14–29
|- style="background:#cfc;"
| 44 
| January 22
| @ Washington
| 
| Jeff Green (39)
| Jared Sullinger (11)
| Gerald Wallace (9)
| Verizon Center14,492
| 15–29
|- style="background:#fcc;"
| 45 
| January 24
| Oklahoma City
| 
| Jeff Green (16)
| 5 players (4)
| Rajon Rondo (8)
| TD Garden18,624
| 15–30
|- style="background:#fcc;"
| 46 
| January 26
| Brooklyn
| 
| Brandon Bass (17)
| Bass, Rondo (8)
| Rajon Rondo (8)
| TD Garden18,624
| 15–31
|- style="background:#fcc;"
| 47 
| January 28
| @ New York
| 
| Jeff Green (14)
| Green, Olynyk (7)
| Rajon Rondo (5)
| Madison Square Garden19,812
| 15–32
|- style="background:#fcc;"
| 48 
| January 29
| Philadelphia
| 
| Jared Sullinger (24)
| Jared Sullinger (17)
| Chris Johnson (5)
| TD Garden18,624
| 15–33

|- style="background:#cfc;"
| 49 
| February 2
| Orlando
| 
| Jared Sullinger (21)
| Jared Sullinger (12)
| Rajon Rondo (10)
| TD Garden18,624
| 16–33
|- style="background:#cfc;"
| 50 
| February 5
| @ Philadelphia
| 
| Jeff Green (36)
| Jared Sullinger (10)
| Rajon Rondo (11)
| Wells Fargo Center10,267
| 17–33
|- style="background:#cfc;"
| 51 
| February 7
| Sacramento
| 
| Jared Sullinger (31)
| Jared Sullinger (16)
| Gerald Wallace (9)
| TD Garden18,624
| 18–33
|- style="background:#fcc;"
| 52 
| February 9
| Dallas
| 
| Jeff Green (18)
| Jared Sullinger (9)
| Jared Sullinger (12)
| TD Garden17,650
| 18–34
|- style="background:#cfc;"
| 53 
| February 10
| @ Milwaukee
| 
| Jeff Green (29)
| Jared Sullinger (10)
| Phil Pressey & Jerryd Bayless (6)
| BMO Harris Bradley Center
| 19–34
|- style="background:#fcc;"
| 54 
| February 12
| San Antonio
| 
| Rajon Rondo (16)
| Kelly Olynyk (10)
| Jerryd Bayless (9)
| TD Garden17,922
| 19–35
|- align="center"
|colspan="9" bgcolor="#bbcaff"|All-Star Break
|- style="background:#fcc;"
| 55 
| February 19
| @ Phoenix
| 
| Bass, Rondo (18)
| Bass, Sullinger (8)
| Rajon Rondo (10)
| US Airways Center16,135
| 19–36
|- style="background:#fcc;"
| 56 
| February 21
| @ L.A. Lakers
| 
| Jeff Green (21)
| Jared Sullinger (12)
| Rajon Rondo (11)
| Staples Center18,997
| 19–37
|- style="background:#fcc;"
| 57 
| February 22
| @ Sacramento
| 
| Jeff Green (29)
| Kris Humphries (8)
| Humphries, Bayless (4)
| Sleep Train Arena17,317
| 19–38
|- style="background:#fcc;"
| 58 
| February 24
| @ Utah
| 
| Green, Olynyk (21)
| Bass, Olynyk (8)
| Rajon Rondo (10)
| EnergySolutions Arena17,130
| 19–39
|- style="background:#cfc;"
| 59 
| February 26
| Atlanta
| 
| Jerryd Bayless (29)
| Gerald Wallace (10)
| Rajon Rondo (11)
| TD Garden16,605
| 20–39

|- style="background:#fcc;"
| 60 
| March 1
| Indiana
| 
| Jeff Green (27)
| Kris Humphries (10)
| Rajon Rondo (11)
| TD Garden18,624
| 20–40
|- style="background:#fcc;"
| 61 
| March 5
| Golden State
| 
| Kelly Olynyk (19)
| Brandon Bass (8)
| Rajon Rondo (7)
| TD Garden18,155
| 20–41
|- style="background:#cfc;"
| 62 
| March 7
| Brooklyn
| 
| Rajon Rondo (20)
| Jared Sullinger (12)
| Rajon Rondo (9)
| TD Garden18,195
| 21–41
|- style="background:#cfc;"
| 63 
| March 9
| Detroit
| 
| Jeff Green (27)
| Kris Humphries (11)
| Rajon Rondo (18)
| TD Garden18,624
| 22–41
|- style="background:#fcc;"
| 64 
| March 11
| @ Indiana
| 
| Jared Sullinger (17)
| Sullinger, Humphries (9)
| Rajon Rondo (8)
| Bankers Life Fieldhouse18,165
| 22–42
|- style="background:#fcc;"
| 65 
| March 12
| New York
| 
| Jeff Green (27)
| Jared Sullinger (8)
| Phil Pressey (5)
| TD Garden18,624
| 22–43
|- style="background:#fcc;"
| 66 
| March 14
| Phoenix
| 
| Humphries, Johnson (11)
| Kris Humphries (13)
| Rondo, Pressey (5)
| TD Garden18,624
| 22–44
|- style="background:#fcc;"
| 67 
| March 16
| @ New Orleans
| 
| Jeff Green (39)
| Kris Humphries (12)
| Rajon Rondo (14)
| Smoothie King Center17,050
| 22–45
|- style="background:#fcc;"
| 68 
| March 17
| @ Dallas
| 
| Jerryd Bayless (19)
| Kris Humphries (14)
| Jerryd Bayless (6)
| American Airlines Center20,132
| 22–46
|- style="background:#cfc;"
| 69 
| March 19
| Miami
| 
| Avery Bradley (23)
| Rajon Rondo (10)
| Rajon Rondo (15)
| TD Garden18,624
| 23–46
|- style="background:#fcc;"
| 70 
| March 21
| @ Brooklyn
| 
| Avery Bradley (28)
| Kris Humphries (8)
| Rajon Rondo (12)
| Barclays Center17,732
| 23–47
|- style="background:#fcc;"
| 71 
| March 26
| Toronto
| 
| Jared Sullinger (26)
| Jared Sullinger (8)
| Rajon Rondo (15)
| TD Garden18,341
| 23–48
|- style="background:#fcc;"
| 72 
| March 28
| @ Toronto
| 
| Jerryd Bayless (20)
| Jared Sullinger (9)
| Rajon Rondo (8)
| Air Canada Centre19,800
| 23–49
|- style="background:#fcc;"
| 73 
| March 30
| Chicago
| 
| Rajon Rondo (17)
| Jared Sullinger (10)
| Rajon Rondo (11)
| TD Garden18,624
| 23–50
|- style="background:#fcc;"
| 74 
| March 31
| @ Chicago
| 
| Bass, Bayless (18)
| Brandon Bass (9)
| Jerryd Bayless (5)
| United Center21,494
| 23–51

|- style="background:#fcc;"
| 75 
| April 2
| @ Washington
| 
| Jared Sullinger (27)
| Christapher Johnson (8)
| Pressey, Rondo (6)
| Verizon Center17,770
| 23–52
|- style="background:#fcc;"
| 76 
| April 4
| Philadelphia
| 
| Jerryd Bayless (23)
| Bass, Rondo (11)
| Rajon Rondo (16)
| TD Garden18,624
| 23–53
|- style="background:#fcc;"
| 77 
| April 5
| @ Detroit
| 
| Jerryd Bayless (25)
| Jared Sullinger (10)
| Phil Pressey (11)
| Palace of Auburn Hills19,558
| 23–54
|- style="background:#fcc;"
| 78 
| April 9
| @ Atlanta
| 
| Avery Bradley (24) 
| Jared Sullinger (11)
| Rajon Rondo (12)
| Philips Arena13,868
| 23–55
|- style="background:#cfc;"
| 79 
| April 11
| Charlotte
| 
| Avery Bradley (22)
| Brandon Bass (9)
| Phil Pressey (13)
| TD Garden18,624
| 24–55
|- style="background:#cfc;"
| 80 
| April 12
| @ Cleveland
| 
| Olynyk, Bradley (25)
| Kelly Olynyk (12)
| Phil Pressey (13)
| Quicken Loans Arena18,456
| 25–55
|- style="background:#fcc;"
| 81 
| April 14
| @ Philadelphia
| 
| Kelly Olynyk (28)
| Rajon Rondo (11)
| Rajon Rondo (14)
| Wells Fargo Center17,822
| 25–56
|- style="background:#fcc;"
| 82 
| April 16
| Washington
| 
| Kelly Olynyk (24)
| Olynyk, Bass (7)
| Phil Pressey (10)
| TD Garden18,624
| 25–57

Player statistics

|-style="text-align:center"
|   
| 21 || 0 || 7.1 || .385 ||  || .333 || 1.5 || .1 || .1 || .4 || 1.0
|-style="text-align:center"
|  
| 14 || 0 || 9.4 || .267 || .222 ||  || 1.2 || .2 || .4 || .0 || 1.6
|-style="text-align:center"
|  
| 82 || 73 || 27.6 || .486 || .333 || .858 || 5.7 || 1.1 || .4 ||style="background:#efe196;color:#008040;"| .9 || 11.1
|-style="text-align:center"
|   
| 41 || 14 || 25.3 || .418 || .395 || .803 || 2.1 || 3.1 || 1.0 || .1 || 10.1
|-style="text-align:center"
|  
| 3 || 0 || 5.0 || .500 || .000 || .200 || 1.0 || .3 || .0 || .0 || 1.7
|-style="text-align:center"
|  
| 6 || 0 || 9.2 || .500 ||style="background:#efe196;color:#008040;"| .500 ||style="background:#efe196;color:#008040;"| 1.000 || .5 || .5 || .2 || .0 || 2.0
|-style="text-align:center"
|  
| 60 || 58 || 30.9 || .438 || .395 || .804 || 3.8 || 1.4 || 1.1 || .2 || 14.9
|-style="text-align:center"
|   
| 10 || 0 || 7.3 || .375 ||style="background:#efe196;color:#008040;"| .500 || .786 || 1.9 || .4 || .1 || .1 || 3.1
|-style="text-align:center"
|   
| 39 || 35 || 30.7 || .413 || .318 || .873 || 3.1 || 5.7 || .9 || .1 || 13.7
|-style="text-align:center"
|  
| 37 || 8 || 13.2 || .435 || .300 || .649 || 3.5 || .4 || .4 || .7 || 4.4
|-style="text-align:center"
|  
|style="background:#efe196;color:#008040;"| 82 ||style="background:#efe196;color:#008040;"| 82 ||style="background:#efe196;color:#008040;"| 34.2 || .412 || .341 || .795 || 4.6 || 1.7 || .7 || .6 ||style="background:#efe196;color:#008040;"| 16.9
|-style="text-align:center"
|  
| 69 || 30 || 19.9 || .501 || .000 || .813 || 5.9 || 1.0 || .4 ||style="background:#efe196;color:#008040;"| .9 || 8.4
|-style="text-align:center"
|  
| 40 || 0 || 19.7 || .397 || .339 || .860 || 2.4 || .8 || .7 || .1 || 6.3
|-style="text-align:center"
|   
| 30 || 0 || 16.8 || .492 || .442 || .818 || 1.6 || 1.1 || .7 || .3 || 7.4
|-style="text-align:center"
|  
| 70 || 9 || 20.0 || .466 || .351 || .811 || 5.2 || 1.6 || .5 || .4 || 8.7
|-style="text-align:center"
|  
| 75 || 11 || 15.1 || .308 || .264 || .644 || 1.4 || 3.2 || .9 || .1 || 2.8
|-style="text-align:center"
|  
| 30 || 30 || 33.3 || .403 || .289 || .627 || 5.5 ||style="background:#efe196;color:#008040;"| 9.8 ||style="background:#efe196;color:#008040;"| 1.3 || .1 || 11.7
|-style="text-align:center"
|  
| 74 || 44 || 27.6 || .427 || .269 || .778 ||style="background:#efe196;color:#008040;"| 8.1 || 1.6 || .5 || .7 || 13.3
|-style="text-align:center"
|  
| 58 || 16 || 24.4 ||style="background:#efe196;color:#008040;"| .504 || .297 || .465 || 3.7 || 2.5 ||style="background:#efe196;color:#008040;"| 1.3 || .2 || 5.1
|}

 Statistics with the Boston Celtics.

Awards
 Kelly Olynyk was selected to the NBA All-Rookie Second Team at the end of the season.
 Jordan Crawford was named Eastern Conference Player of the Week for games played from December 2 through December 8.
 Jared Sullinger was named Eastern Conference Player of the Week for games played from February 3 through February 9.

Transactions

Overview

Trades

References

External links

Boston Celtics
Boston Celtics seasons
Boston Celtics
Boston Celtics
Celtics
Celtics